A pentatope number is a number in the fifth cell of any row of Pascal's triangle starting with the 5-term row , either from left to right or from right to left. 

The first few numbers of this kind are:

 1, 5, 15, 35, 70, 126, 210, 330, 495, 715, 1001, 1365 

Pentatope numbers belong to the class of figurate numbers, which can be represented as regular, discrete geometric patterns.

Formula 
The formula for the th pentatope number is represented by the 4th rising factorial of  divided by the factorial of 4:

The pentatope numbers can also be represented as binomial coefficients:

which is the number of distinct quadruples that can be selected from  objects, and it is read aloud as " plus three choose four".

Properties 
Two of every three pentatope numbers are also pentagonal numbers. To be precise, the th pentatope number is always the th pentagonal number and the th pentatope number is always the th pentagonal number. The th pentatope number is the generalized pentagonal number obtained by taking the negative index  in the formula for pentagonal numbers. (These expressions always give integers).

This can be derived using telescoping series.

Pentatope numbers can be represented as the sum of the first  tetrahedral numbers:

and are also related to tetrahedral numbers themselves:

No prime number is the predecessor of a pentatope number (it needs to check only -1 and 4=22), and the largest semiprime which is the predecessor of a pentatope number is 1819.

Similarly, the only primes preceding a 6-simplex number are 83 and 461.

Test for pentatope numbers 
We can derive this test from the formula for the th pentatope number.

Given a positive integer , to test whether it is a pentatope number we can compute

The number  is pentatope if and only if  is a natural number. In that case  is the th pentatope number.

Generating function 
The generating function for pentatope numbers is

Applications 
In biochemistry, the pentatope numbers represent the number of possible arrangements of n different polypeptide subunits in a tetrameric (tetrahedral) protein.

References

Figurate numbers
Simplex numbers